Everythings for Sale  is the debut studio album by American rapper Boogie. It was released on January 25, 2019, by Shady Records, Interscope Records. The album includes guest appearances from 6lack, Christian Scott, Eminem, JID, and Snoh Aalegra, with production mainly coming from Keyel, Jeff Gitelman, and Dart, among others.

Promotion
On January 23, 2019, Boogie released a short-film for the album, produced by Riley Keough, Gina Gammell, and Malcolm Washington. The idea came when Boogie was discussing what each song would look visually.

Singles 
The album's first single, called "Self Destruction" was released on May 25, 2018.

The album's second single, called "Silent Ride" was released on January 9, 2019.

Promotional singles 
The album's promotional single, called "Deja Vu" was released for digital download on August 29, 2018, one day before his 29th birthday. The song was produced by Keyel and Sean Matsukawa.

Critical reception

Upon its release, the album received a widespread critical acclaim. Aaron McKrell of HipHopDX gave the album 4.2 out of 5, claiming it was "worth fans' patience" and an effective introduction to "a troubled young man with a brilliant mind whose musings are starkly engaging". Trey Alston from Pitchfork said "The Compton rapper's debut is smart, technically dazzling, and thoroughly sullen". In a one-listen review, Yoh Phillips from DJBooth said "Boogie reminds me of a film director who is able to turn every actor before their lens into a character that the audience feel as if they know personally". The album was positively received by Complex Media's morning debate show "Everyday Struggle". The album's maturity and features were particularly well-liked. XXL Magazine lauded Boogie's no holds barred brand of self awareness, noting "He doesn’t have it all figured out. He gets sad and angry and knows he needs to improve". The publication gave the album an "XL" on a "S" to "XXL" scale.

Commercial performance
The album debuted at number 28 on the US Billboard 200 and number 18 on the US Top R&B/Hip-Hop Albums chart, selling 18,397 album-equivalent units in its first week.

Track listing
Credits adapted from Tidal, BMI, ASCAP, AllMusic, and UMPG.

Charts

See also
2019 in hip hop music

References

2019 debut albums
Shady Records albums
Boogie (rapper) albums
Interscope Records albums
Albums produced by Symbolyc One